Cape Weyprecht is a headland in the northeast part of Spitsbergen in Svalbard, in the area known as Olav V Land.

The cape is named after Karl Weyprecht, an Austro-Hungarian officer and polar explorer. Together with Julius von Payer, he led the Austro-Hungarian North Pole Expedition that discovered Franz Josef Land in 1873. Weyprecht himself was never on Svalbard.

References

Headlands of Spitsbergen